Velcheru Narayana Rao is an Indian author, critic, researcher, translator and professor at the University of Wisconsin–Madison for Department of South Asian Studies. His work is primarily focused on Telugu literature for which he received the Sahitya Akademi Fellowship in February 2021.

He was born West Godavari district, Andhra Pradesh. He obtained his MA from Andhra University and later obtained a diploma in linguistics from Osmania University in 1970.

Work 
Rao has translated several Telugu language books into English including Gurajada Apparao's Kanyasulkam as Girls for Sale: Kanyasulkam A Play from Colonial India and Allasani Peddana's Manu Charitramu as The Story of Manu. He has co-authored books with David Shulman and Sanjay Subrahmanyam such as God on the Hills: Temple Songs from Tirupati and Textures of Time: Writing History in South India. He also wrote a books on Telugu poetry titled Hibiscus on the Lake: Twentieth Century Telugu Poetry from India.

Bibliography 
1998 (with David Shulman), A Poem at the Right Moment: Remembered Verses from Premodern South India, University of California Press.
2002 (with David Shulman and Sanjay Subrahmanyan), Textures of Time: Writing History in South India, Paris, Seuil, Permanent Black, Delhi.
2002 (with David Shulman), Classical Telugu Poetry: An Anthology, University of California Press, Oxford University Press, New Delhi.
2002 (with David Shulman), The Sound of the Kiss, or the Story that Must be Told. Pingali Suranna's Kaḷāpūrṇōdayamu, Columbia University Press.
2002 (with David Shulman), A Lover's Guide to Warangal. The Kridabhiramamu of Vallabharaya, Permanent Black, New Delhi.
2006 (Translation, with David Shulman) The Demon's Daughter: A Love Story from South India, (by Piṅgaḷi Sūrana) SUNY Press, Albany.
2005 (with David Shulman), God on the Hill: temple poems from Tirupati, Oxford University Press, New York.
2012 (With David Shulman) Srinatha: The Poet who Made Gods and Kings, Oxford University Press.
2015 (Translation of Allasani Peddana, with David Shulman) The Story of Manu. Murti Classical Library of India.

References

External links 
Narayana Rao at the University of Wisconsin–Madison

Date of birth missing (living people)
Living people
21st-century Indian male writers
Writers from Vijayawada
Telugu-language writers
Indian literary critics
21st-century Indian translators
Recipients of the Sahitya Akademi Fellowship
Telugu people
People from Andhra Pradesh
Year of birth missing (living people)
20th-century Indian male writers
20th-century translators
21st-century Indian non-fiction writers
20th-century Indian non-fiction writers
Indian male non-fiction writers